Clue Club is an American animated television series produced by Hanna-Barbera Productions and broadcast on CBS from September 4 to December 11, 1976.

Overview
The series follows a group of four teenage detectives, the Clue Club – Larry, Pepper, D.D. and Dottie – who solved mysteries with the help of two talking dogs, a bloodhound and basset hound named Woofer and Wimper. Clue Club mysteries usually involved investigating bizarre crimes such as animals, trains, airports, a movie director and statues vanishing into thin air.

Clue Club only had one season's worth of first-run episodes produced, which were shown on Saturday mornings on CBS.

In the fall of 1977, cut-down versions of the half-hour episodes of Clue Club appeared under the new title Woofer & Wimper, Dog Detectives to showcase the show's bloodhound and basset hound which aired as a segment on the CBS Saturday morning package program The Skatebirds from September 10, 1977, to January 21, 1978. When The Skatebirds was cancelled in early 1978, Woofer & Wimper, Dog Detectives re-appeared as a segment alongside The Three Robonic Stooges on their half-hour show from January 28 to September 2, 1978, also on CBS.

The full-length versions of Clue Club returned to CBS on Sunday mornings from September 10, 1978, to January 21, 1979, concluding the show's original network run. After a mid-1980s re-airing on USA Cartoon Express, it has since resurfaced on Cartoon Network (as part of the Mysteries, Inc. block) in the 1990s and Boomerang in the 2000s.

Characters
The series features the following seven main characters throughout its run: 
 Paul Winchell as Woofer, a bloodhound who would constantly accuse suspects without good reason, then later back-track while haughtily proclaiming his genius to satisfy his ego; he also wears a deerstalkers' cap on his head.
 Jim MacGeorge as Wimper, a more down-to-earth, easy-going, yet intelligent basset hound who would at times go along with Woofer’s schemes, and other times he would turn the tables on his comrade.
 David Jolliffe as Larry, the older member and leader of the Clue Club; he normally interviewed the suspect(s) and/or passed on the Club's findings to Dottie.
 Patricia Stich as Pepper, a beautiful blonde and Dottie's elder sister; she searched for clues and/or evidence, mostly accompanied by D.D., which often lead to them being chased by the villains.
 Bob Hastings as D.D., a bespectacled redhead wearing a Sherlock Holmes style hat, he often teamed up with Pepper to search for clues; it was never revealed what D.D.'s initials stood for.
 Tara Talboy as Dottie, the youngest member of the Clue Club (13 years old), she endured an arsenal of deprecating nicknames from her elder sister Pepper and friends: "half-pint", "short-stuff" and the like. A prodigy, she normally stayed at home. From there, Dottie provided case-solving information from her minicomputer and/or results from various forensic tests. She also had access to high-tech communications equipment, including audio/video links to the Club's car and to their wristwatches, which doubled as pagers. Dottie's friends were highly protective of her, and resented it when she joined them in the field, which the girl frequently did after running out of "homework".
 John Stephenson as Sheriff Bagley, the local sheriff who frequently relied on the Clue Club for assistance and arrested suspects at their conclusion; story editor Sid Morse's bible revealed Sheriff Bagley's first name: Lester.

Episodes

Broadcast history
Clue Club aired in these following formats on CBS:
 Clue Club (August 14, 1976 – September 3, 1977, CBS Saturday)
 The Skatebirds (as Woofer & Wimper, Dog Detectives) (September 10, 1977 – January 21, 1978, CBS Saturday) (rerun)
 The Three Robonic Stooges (as Woofer & Wimper, Dog Detectives) (January 28, 1978 – September 2, 1978, CBS Saturday) (rerun)
 Clue Club (September 10, 1978 – January 21, 1979, CBS Sunday) (rerun)

Broadcast schedules (all EDT):
 August 14, 1976 – September 4, 1976, CBS Saturday 9:30-10:00 AM
 September 11, 1976 – November 20, 1976, CBS Saturday 11:30 AM–12:00 PM
 November 27, 1976 – September 3, 1977, CBS Saturday 8:30-9:00 AM
 September 10, 1977 – November 12, 1977, CBS Saturday 9:30-10:30 AM
 November 19, 1977 – January 21, 1978, CBS Saturday 8:00-9:00 AM
 January 28, 1978 – September 2, 1978, CBS Saturday 8:00-8:30 AM
 September 10, 1978 – January 21, 1979, CBS Sunday 9:30-10:00 AM

Merchandising
In 1977–79, merchandising for Clue Club included: a coloring book (Clue Club Saves the Day), story book (Clue Club: The Case of the Missing Racehorse by Fern G. Brown), read & color book (Clue Club: The Racetrack Mystery), jigsaw puzzles, rub-on transfers and a school tablet.

Marvel Comics featured Clue Club stories ("Mrs. Macree's Mystery" and "The Root of All Evil!") in two issues of the short-lived anthology comic series Hanna-Barbera TV Stars #2 (October 1978) and #4 (February 1979). Outside of these American comics, Clue Club stories were also featured in Clue Club Annual 1979 hardback book published by World Distributors in the United Kingdom.

A board game titled as "The Clue Club Game" was released only in Europe in 1979.

Home media
On August 11, 2015, Warner Archive released Clue Club: The Complete Animated Series on DVD in region 1 as part of their Hanna–Barbera Classics Collection. This is a Manufacture-on-Demand (MOD) release, available exclusively through Warner's online store and Amazon.com.

Other appearances
 D.D. makes a cameo appearance in Scooby-Doo! Mask of the Blue Falcon.
 The cast of Clue Club appear in the HBO Max original series Jellystone!. Larry, D.D. and Sheriff Bagley are dark-skinned in this continuity.
 The Club Club are shown on a list in the Velma episode "Velma Makes a List".

References

External links
 
 Clue Club at the Big Cartoon DataBase
 

1976 American television series debuts
1979 American television series endings
1970s American animated television series
American children's animated comedy television series
American children's animated mystery television series
American detective television series
Animated television series about dogs
CBS original programming
English-language television shows
Teen animated television series
Television series by Hanna-Barbera
Television series by Warner Bros. Television Studios